Blake Shelton is an American singer, s songwriter and television personality. Throughout the course of his career, Shelton has been honoured with many accolades, including being member of the Grand Ole Opry, in 2010 and inducted into the Oklahoma Hall of Fame in 2014.

Shelton has been the recipient of 10 Country Music Association Awards, six Academy of Country Music Awards, one CMT Artist of the Year award, and 10 CMT Music Awards. He has also received eight American Country Awards, seven People's Choice Awards, three American Music Awards, one Billboard Music Award, and one iHeartRadio Music Award. Shelton has garnered nine Grammy nominations throughout his career, including nominations for Best Country Album, Best Country Solo Performance, and Best Music Film.

The CMA Awards also recognizes Shelton, in addition to George Strait and Vince Gill, as the record holders for the most Male Vocalist of the Year wins, as all three have each garnered five victories. On January 18, 2017, Shelton made People's Choice Awards history by becoming the first country artist to ever win the all-genre category of Favorite Album over competitors Beyoncé, Drake, Rihanna and Ariana Grande.

As a television personality and supporter of country music, Shelton was awarded the prestigious Gene Weed Special Achievement Award from the Academy of Country Music in 2013. For his work on The Voice, Shelton received the NATPE Reality Breakthrough Award for Best Reality Personality in 2017.

Academy of Country Music Awards

Source:

American Country Awards

American Country Countdown Awards

American Music Awards

ASCAP Awards
The American Society of Composers, Authors and Publishers (ASCAP) hosts a series of awards shows, honoring artists in different music categories; Country music is one of its seven categories. Shelton has been honored 29 times by the ASCAP Country Music Awards.

Billboard Music Awards

BMI Awards
The Broadcast Music, Incorporated (BMI) Awards is an annual award show hosted for the purpose of giving awards to songwriters. Songwriters are selected each year from the entire BMI catalog, based on the number of performances during the award period. Shelton has been honored with 29 BMI Country awards.

Country Music Association Awards

Country Radio Seminar

CMC Music Awards

CMT Music Awards

Teddy Awards
The CMT Teddy Awards is a special music video award show dedicated to celebrate Valentine's Day.

Grammy Awards

iHeartRadio Music Awards

Inspirational Country Music Awards
The Inspirational Country Music Awards are a member-voted award show dedicated to honoring and showcasing the biggest names and emerging talent among artists who perform Christian and inspirational country music. It was established in 1992.

Kids' Choice Awards

MTV Movie & TV Awards

Music Row Awards

Country Breakout Awards

NATPE Reality Breakthrough Awards

People's Choice Awards

Rare Country Awards

Teen Choice Awards

World Music Awards

Young Hollywood Awards

Other honors

Inductions
2010: Grand Ole Opry
2014: Oklahoma Hall of Fame

References

Lists of awards received by American actor
Lists of awards received by American musician